Il Porcellino (Italian "piglet") is the local Florentine nickname for the bronze fountain of a boar. The fountain figure was sculpted and cast by Baroque master Pietro Tacca (1577–1640) shortly before 1634, following a marble Italian copy of a Hellenistic marble original, at the time in the Grand Ducal collections and today on display in the classical section of the Uffizi Museum. The original, which was found in Rome and removed to Florence in the mid-16th century by the Medici, was associated from the time of its rediscovery with the Calydonian Boar of Greek myth.

Tacca's bronze, which has eclipsed the Roman marble that served as model, was originally intended for the Boboli Garden, then moved to the Mercato Nuovo in Florence, Italy; the fountain was placed originally facing east, in via Calimala, in front of the pharmacy that by association gained the name Farmacia del Cinghiale (Italian for "boar"). To gain more space for market traffic it was later moved to the side facing south, where it still stands as one of the most popular features for tourists. The present statue is a modern copy, cast in 1998 by Ferdinando Marinelli Artistic Foundry and replaced in 2008, while Tacca's bronze is sheltered in the new Museo Stefano Bardini in Palazzo Mozzi.

Visitors to Il Porcellino put a coin into the boar's gaping jaws, with the intent to let it fall through the underlying grating for good luck, and they rub the boar's snout to ensure a return to Florence, a tradition that the Scottish literary traveller Tobias Smollett already noted in 1766, which has kept the snout in a state of polished sheen while the rest of the boar's body has patinated to a dull brownish-green.

Copies

Copies of the sculpture can be found around the world. Some of the locations are:

Australia
Sydney Hospital, Sydney, NSW

Belgium
Royal Greenhouses of Laeken, Brussels
Place de Bastogne, Koekelberg, Brussels
Enghien Park, Enghien
 Antwerp Zoo

Canada
Butchart Gardens, Victoria, BC
Modern Languages building, University of Waterloo, Waterloo, ON
Art Gallery of Nova Scotia, Halifax, NS

Denmark
Brotorvet, Holstebro

France
Musée du Louvre, Paris
Place Richelme, Aix-en-Provence

Germany
Sitzender Keiler (recreation by Martin Mayer) in the Borstei and in front of the Deutschen Jagd- und Fischereimuseum, Munich

Italy
Rispescia, Grosseto, Tuscany

Japan
Fuji City, Shizuoka Prefecture
Uroko no Ie, Kitano Ijinkan, Kobe, Hyogo Prefecture

Norway
Slemdal skole, Oslo

Spain
Parque de El Capricho, Madrid

Sweden
Lejonet och svinet, Stockholm

United Kingdom
Derby Arboretum, Derby, England
Chatsworth House, Derbyshire, England
Leweston School, Dorset, England
Castle Howard, North Yorkshire
St Mary's College, Durham, Durham, England
Kimmerghame House, Scottish Borders, Scotland
Osborne House, Isle of Wight, England

U.S.
Arkansas
University of Arkansas campus, Fayetteville
California
Viansa Winery, Sonoma
Colorado
Museum of Outdoor Arts, Englewood
Connecticut
Choate Rosemary Hall, Wallingford
Delaware
Delaware Museum of Natural History, Delaware
Georgia
Armstrong Kessler Mansion, 447 Bull Street, Savannah, Georgia
Hawaii
Honolulu, private collection
Illinois,
Riverview Inn & Suites, Rockford, IL
Kansas 
The Villages Shopping Center, Prairie Village, KS
Kentucky
Louisville, private collection
Louisiana
R.W. Norton Art Gallery, Shreveport
Missouri
Country Club Plaza, N.W. Corner of 47th Street and Wornall Road, Kansas City
New York
Sutton Park, New York
The Great Escape & Splashwater Kingdom amusement park at Queensbury. Just inside the entrance.
North Carolina
Mar Boar Restaurant Wallace, NC
Pennsylvania
Former Strawbridge & Clothier store, 801 Market Street, Philadelphia
South Carolina
Poinsett Plaza, Greenville
Texas
Plaza Skillman Shopping Center, Dallas
Dallas Zoo, Dallas
Rice Village, Houston
Vermont
Lyndon Center

In popular culture
The sculpture appears in literature as well as onscreen.

In literature
The Porcellino figures in Hans Christian Andersen's "The Bronze Hog" in A Poet's Bazaar.

In film
Il Porcellino appears in the 2001 film Hannibal when Chief Inspector Rinaldo Pazzi (Giancarlo Giannini) cleans his hands in the fountain.

The statue is also seen briefly in Harry Potter and the Chamber of Secrets (2002) as Harry Potter and Ron Weasley climb the Hogwarts staircase after crashing into the Whomping Willow, and again on the same staircase during the flashback scene where Tom Riddle speaks to Albus Dumbledore. It also appears in Harry Potter and the Deathly Hallows –Part 2 (2011) in the Room of Requirement.

In 1962's film Light in the Piazza, starring Olivia De Havilland, George Hamilton, and Yvette Mimieux, a young George Hamilton plays Fabrizio. After buying flowers for Yvette's character, Clara, he pats the boars snout for luck. Citation: Light in the Piazza. Arthur Freed. MGM, February 7, 1962. Film.

Gallery

References

External links

 Porcellino (Museum of Outdoor Arts)
 Smithsonian Institution SIRIS Inventory
 The Florentine - article » The Porcellino
 The legend of Porcellino

Bronze sculptures
1630s sculptures
Pigs in art
Fountains in Florence
Outdoor sculptures in Florence